Oropouche or Oropuche can refer to:
Cumaca Cave
Oropouche (constituency), a constituency in the parliament of Trinidad and Tobago
Oropouche fever
Oropouche River
Oropouche West (constituency), a constituency in the parliament of Trinidad and Tobago
South Oropouche, a community in Trinidad and Tobago